Maureen Elizabeth Murphy (March 23, 1939 – January 22, 2019) was an American competition swimmer who represented the United States at the 1956 Summer Olympics in Melbourne, Australia.  Murphy competed in the women's 100-meter backstroke, and finished fifth overall in the event final with a time of 1:14.1.

References

1939 births
2019 deaths
American female backstroke swimmers
Olympic swimmers of the United States
Swimmers at the 1956 Summer Olympics
Swimmers from Portland, Oregon
21st-century American women